Kangal is a 1953 Indian Tamil language film, directed by Krishnan–Panju. The film stars Sivaji Ganesan, Pandari Bai and S. V. Sahasranamam. It was released on 5 November 1953.

Plot

Cast 
Sivaji Ganesan
Pandari Bai
S. V. Sahasranamam
Mynavathi
V. K. Ramasamy
M. N. Rajam
J. P. Chandrababu
C. T. Rajakantham
T. S. Jaya

Soundtrack 
The music was composed by G. Ramanathan and S. V. Venkatraman while the lyrics were penned by Kambadasan, K. P. Kamatchi and Kanagasurabhi.

References

External links 
 

1950s Tamil-language films
1953 films
Films directed by Krishnan–Panju
Films scored by S. V. Venkatraman
Films scored by G. Ramanathan